Collagen alpha-1(XXVI) chain is a protein that in humans is encoded by the EMID2 gene.

References

Further reading

External links